The Type 98 20 mm AA half-track vehicle was an experimental Japanese self-propelled anti-aircraft gun. It had a single 20 mm Type 98 AA cannon mounted on the back section of a Type 98 four-ton half-track. The modified vehicle used was designated the Type 98 half-tracked prime mover Ko-Hi. The Type 98 Ko-Hi was first manufactured in 1938 by Isuzu.

The Type 98 four-ton vehicles were "high speed" prime movers, capable of  when loaded. It had a diesel engine and required a crew of 15 to operate. The rear-mounted Type 98 20 mm AA autocannon was the most common light anti-aircraft gun of the Imperial Japanese Army. It had a range of 5,500 meters, altitude of 3,500 meters and could fire up to 300 rounds per minute.

See also 
 20 mm AA machine cannon carrier
 Type 98 20 mm AAG tank

Notes

References
Imperial Japanese Army Page - Akira Takizawa
Isuzu

World War II self-propelled anti-aircraft weapons
20 mm artillery
World War II vehicles of Japan
World War II weapons of Japan
Military vehicles introduced in the 1930s
World War II half-tracks